Ein Kessel Buntes ("A Kettle of Colour") was a television variety show in the former East Germany. It broadcast from 1972 to 1992. A total of 113 shows were made, six per year. It was sent at first from the Friedrichstadtpalast theatre, and later from the Palast der Republik, as well as from other prominent music halls in other East German cities. Its title sequence showed a series of famous clocks in East Berlin, such as that on the Rotes Rathaus and the Weltzeituhr at Alexanderplatz displaying the time of broadcast, 8 p.m. (scheduled to clash with the main evening news on ARD)

Ein Kessel Buntes was originally hosted by actors Horst Köbbert (who spoke Low German from the north), Lutz Stückrath (a speaker of the Berlin dialect), and Manfred Uhlig (who spoke Saxon from the south), whose satirical commentary during the live broadcasts often criticised the East German government. They were soon replaced by a rotating cast of celebrities.

The show was meant to compete with those on West German television (which most East Germans were able to receive, and often watched). To this end it was fairly successful even attracting a following in parts of West Germany which could receive Eastern TV. Its production values were high. Apart from song and dance numbers and appearances from East German celebrities, almost every broadcast featured well-known stars from the west, often after their popularity had peaked in their home countries.

After German reunification, and the dissolution of Fernsehen der DDR, the concept and name of the program were taken over by ARD and broadcast on Das Erste, following the main news programme Tagesschau. In its final two years of "Ein Kessel Buntes", Karsten Speck hosted the show on January 12, 1991, a total of ten times. At one time, Frank Schöbel moderated the program. The last show ran on 19 December 1992. It is still popular in reruns and best-of shows.

Numerous international stars were invited to participate: ABBA, Amanda Lear, Secret Service, Bad Boys Blue, Dalida, Karel Gott, Dara Rolins, Helena Vondráčková, Zsuzsa Koncz, Alla Pugacheva, Sofia Rotaru, Kati Kovács and others.

External links
Stern article about East German television
Short page in German about East German television with music clip from the show
Fan description in English

Literature

Das war unser Kessel Buntes, Hans-Ulrich Brandt, Angela Kaiser, Evelin Matt, Günther Steinbacher
Ein Kessel Buntes und mehr, Hendrik Petzold

Television in East Germany
1980s German television series
1972 German television series debuts
1992 German television series endings
Variety television series
German-language television shows